The PlayStation Classic is a dedicated video game console by Sony Interactive Entertainment that emulates games originally released on its 1994 PlayStation console. It was announced in September 2018 at the Tokyo Game Show, and released on December 3, 2018, the 24th anniversary of the release of the original. The console has been compared to competitor Nintendo's prior releases of the NES Classic Edition and Super NES Classic Edition mini consoles. Despite this, the console received negative reviews from critics, with criticism for its weak game library, use of the original controller, use of PAL versions for certain games, and high price tag, though the console's design did attract praise.

Specifications
The PlayStation Classic ships with two replica PlayStation controllers (the original model without the analog sticks), an HDMI cable, and a USB Micro-A to standard USB-A cable. An AC adapter for the console is sold separately. It includes ports for both controllers, HDMI output, and power via USB. It cannot use PlayStation memory cards. Internally, the console uses a MediaTek MT8167a Quad A35 system on a chip with four central processing cores clocked at @ 1.5 GHz and a Power VR GE8300 graphics processing unit. It includes 16 GB of eMMC flash storage and 1 GB of DDR3 memory.

The Classic uses the ReARMed branch of the free and open source emulator PCSX to play its games.

Games
The PlayStation Classic comes preloaded with 20 games, running off the open source emulator, PCSX ReARMed. Five games were revealed when the console was announced, and the full roster was revealed a month later. Some games vary between regions. The device does not interface with the PlayStation Network, and games will not be added post-launch. Each game can be suspended in a save state by pressing the console's "reset" button. Nine games use the PAL release (favored in most European countries) regardless of the console's release platform, which means they run at a slower framerate of 50 Hz as opposed to the NTSC standard of 60 Hz (favored in North American, Japan, and additional Asian countries), and may respond slower than players from NTSC regions would expect.

The North American version of the dedicated console received a Mature rating from the ESRB due to the inclusion of Grand Theft Auto, Metal Gear Solid and Resident Evil: Director's Cut. Likewise, the European version received an 18 rating from the PEGI group; European package also displays German USK 16 (PEGI ratings are not formally recognized in Germany) and Australian MA 15+ ratings as it is also sold in Australia (another PAL territory). The system box recommends the system for ages 6 and up, and some individual titles such as Rayman have suitable ratings for that age group, but the console provides access to all 20 games, with no parental controls or settings to restrict available games.

 These five games were first announced on September 18, 2018, ahead of the full game list reveal on October 29, 2018.
. These games use the PAL releases.

Reception 

The PlayStation Classic received generally negative reviews from critics overall, with criticism being directed at the game line up, lack of popular titles, the use of PAL versions for certain titles, the use of the original controller, which lacked analog sticks, and the $100 price tag, although its design received praise. Most reviewers criticized the exclusion of many popular PlayStation titles, such as Wipeout, Mortal Kombat 3, Crash Bandicoot, Spyro the Dragon, Tony Hawk's Pro Skater, Tomb Raider, PaRappa the Rapper, Gran Turismo, and Castlevania: Symphony of the Night. Tristan Ogilive of IGN criticised the console's lack of popular titles, the basic user-interface and pointing out that "almost half of the games included in the PlayStation Classic's library are the PAL versions" which caused consistency problems in NTSC regions. Sam Loveridge of GamesRadar+ praised the look of the console, but criticized the selection of games, the weak presentation of the games due to the black bars on the side of the screen, and the short length of the controller cables.

The lower frame rates during gameplay, poor emulation quality, and the user interface were also criticized. John Linneman of Eurogamer's Digital Foundry also gave it a similarly negative review, noting the console's subpar emulation, poor image quality, lack of enhancements and use of PAL game releases on North American units, though he did praise the user interface. Chris Carter of Destructoid shares a similar opinion, citing that the emulation on the classic console is at times, "worse than the original", but praised the instant-state recovery and the size of the internal storage. Joe Juba of Game Informer lamented on the lack of analog sticks on the controller, along with the lacking selection of titles and a barebones menu, which makes the system a good fit only for an "extremely specific audience". However, Twisted Metal, Jumping Flash!, Tekken 3, Final Fantasy VII, and Metal Gear Solid were hailed as the best of the genre. 

In response to the console's perceived weak game selection, many users have modded the console so any amount of game ROM's can be added to the console via external storage, essentially turning the console into a dedicated emulator, similar to software such as Retropie.

Sales 
The PlayStation Classic had sold 120,000 units during its first week in Japan. Reasons for the price drop at this time suggested a combination of overproduction of the unit, over-pricing on the original cost of the unit, or disinterest in the unit, which had been panned by journalists.

References

External links
 

2018 in video gaming
Dedicated consoles
Home video game consoles
Japanese brands
PlayStation (brand)
 
Products introduced in 2018
Sony consoles
ARM-based video game consoles